Jason is a small unincorporated community in eastern North Carolina, United States, in Greene County.  Incorporated in 1885, Jason is an agricultural based community with town water system and volunteer fire service. Jason is located roughly halfway between Snow Hill and LaGrange on Highway 903.  First named Aloc, meaning "leave alone" by the Tuscarora Indian tribe, Jason was settled by the Hardy, Mewborn, Aldridge and Kearney families.  Once a prospering town with a furniture store, post office, and general store, one could buy  groceries, post a letter, purchase alcohol, and be placed in jail, all in the same building.  There was also a cotton mill on the northern side of town, which was one of the first in Greene County.

The Benjamin W. Best House was listed on the National Register of Historic Places in 2006.

References

External links 
 Snow Hill, North Carolina
 Contentnea Development Partnership, Non Profit Economic Development Company Serving Greene County, NC
 Map of Greene County, NC

Unincorporated communities in North Carolina
Unincorporated communities in Greene County, North Carolina
Greenville, North Carolina metropolitan area